Otis "Big Smokey" Smothers (March 21, 1929 – July 23, 1993) was a Chicago blues guitarist and singer. He was a member of Howlin' Wolf's backing band and worked with Muddy Waters, Jimmy Rogers, Bo Diddley, Ike Turner, J. T. Brown, Freddie King, Little Johnny Jones, Little Walter, and Willie Dixon. His younger brother, Abe (born Albert, January 2, 1939November 20, 2010), was the bluesman Little Smokey Smothers, with whom he is sometimes confused.

Biography
Smothers, who was African-American, was born in Lexington, Mississippi, and was taught by his aunt to play the harmonica and the guitar. He relocated to Chicago in 1946. His debut performance on stage was with Johnny Williams and Johnny "Man" Young. In the early part of the 1950s, Smothers played alongside his cousin Lester Davenport and with Arthur "Big Boy" Spires, Earl Hooker, Henry Strong, and Bo Diddley.

In 1956 and 1957, Howlin' Wolf invited Smothers to play as his rhythm guitarist on several tracks recorded for Chess Records, including "Who's Been Talking", "Tell Me", "Change My Way", "Goin' Back Home", "The Natchez Burning", and "I Asked for Water". Smothers secured a recording contract with Federal Records in August 1960. His album Smokey Smothers Sings the Backporch Blues, produced by Sonny Thompson, with Freddie King on lead guitar on some tracks, was released in 1962. A subsequent session produced four tracks, including "Twist with Me Annie", a reworked version of "Work with Me, Annie". As a part-time member of Muddy Waters's backing band, Smothers played on "I Got My Eyes on You" in 1968.

Smothers helped to form the Muddy Waters Junior Band in the late 1950s, as a tribute to Waters. When Waters was on the road, the band would hold down his regular residency gigs in Chicago, performing Waters's songs and serving as a training ground for potential future members of Waters's band, which both Smothers and fellow Junior Band member George "Mojo" Buford eventually joined.

The 1970s were a lean time for Smothers. He returned to recording in 1986, when Red Beans Records issued his album Got My Eyes on You. His backing band was billed as the Ice Cream Men, a nod to his having worked as an ice cream vendor in the 1950s.

Smothers wrote songs for Waters and has a catalogue of songs to his credit, including "I've Been Drinking Muddy Water", "Ain't Gon Be No Monkey Man", and "Can't Judge Nobody."

Later in his life, Smothers suffered from heart disease. He died in Chicago at the age of 64, in July 1993. He was survived by his wife, Earline Smothers, and by their sons and daughters, his five brothers and sisters, and his extended family.

His daughter Crystal Q'Nef Smothers produced a Blues Tribute on the Smothers brothers in 2016, held in Chicago. A documentary was produced by Ms. Smothers in 2019 based on the life stories of Smothers and his younger brother Abe (Little Smokey Smothers) which can be seen on Ari'ze Women Network on Youtube.com.

Discography

Albums
Smokey Smothers Sings the Backporch Blues (1962), King
Drivin' Blues (1966), King (reissue of Sings the Backporch Blues)
Got My Eyes on You (1986), Red Beans
With Howlin' Wolf
The Real Folk Blues (Chess, 1956-64 [1965])

Compilation albums
Chicago Blues Session Volume 1 (1998), Wolf

Bibliography
Larkin, Colin, ed. The Guinness Encyclopedia of Popular Music. vol. 5. New York City, New York: Stockton Press & Guinness Publishing Ltd, 1995.

See also
List of Chicago blues musicians

References

External links
The Black Network - Big Smokey Smothers Biography

1929 births
1993 deaths
American blues guitarists
American male guitarists
American blues singers
Blues musicians from Mississippi
Chicago blues musicians
People from Lexington, Mississippi
20th-century American singers
20th-century American guitarists
Guitarists from Illinois
Guitarists from Mississippi
20th-century American male singers